Bojana Milenković (born 6 March 1997) is a Serbian volleyball player who plays for Alba Blaj and the Serbian national team.

She participated at the 2017 Women's European Volleyball Championship and 2019, winning gold in both occasions.

References

1997 births
Living people
Serbian women's volleyball players
European champions for Serbia
Volleyball players at the 2020 Summer Olympics
Olympic volleyball players of Serbia
Medalists at the 2020 Summer Olympics
Olympic medalists in volleyball
Olympic bronze medalists for Serbia
Serbian expatriate sportspeople in Romania
Serbian expatriate sportspeople in Poland
Serbian expatriate sportspeople in Kazakhstan
Serbian expatriate sportspeople in Italy
Expatriate volleyball players in Romania
Expatriate volleyball players in Poland
Expatriate volleyball players in Kazakhstan
Expatriate volleyball players in Italy
Serie A1 (women's volleyball) players
21st-century Serbian women